The Long Beach City Council is the governing body of the City of Long Beach, California.

The council is composed of 9 members elected from single-member districts for four-year terms. The Mayor is the chief legislative officer of the City and has the power to veto actions of the City Council, presides at meetings of the City Council, and has no vote, but may participate fully in the deliberations and proceedings of the City Council.

Every two years, at the same time that Council members regularly take office for new terms, the Council selects one of its members to be the Vice-Mayor. As of 2018, annual salaries were $36,170 for council members and $144,655 for the mayor.

Regular council meetings are held in the Long Beach City Hall on Tuesdays at 5pm except on holidays or if decided by special resolution.

Current members

Officers:

References 

California city councils
Government in Long Beach, California